Climate change in Turkey includes changes in the climate of Turkey, their effects and how the country is adapting to those changes. Turkey's annual and maximum temperatures are rising, and 2020 was the third hottest year on record. Turkey will be greatly affected by climate change, and is already experiencing more extreme weather, with droughts and heatwaves being the main hazards. 

Current greenhouse gas emissions by Turkey are about 1% of the global total, and energy policy includes heavily subsidizing coal in Turkey. The Environment Ministry co-ordinates adaptation to climate change, which has been planned for water resources by river basin, and for agriculture. Turkey ratified the Paris Agreement in 2021.

Greenhouse gas emissions

Impacts on the natural environment

There were two significant periods of climate change in the Bronze Age. According to Prof. Dr. Murat Türkeş, a member of the board of Boğaziçi University's Center for Climate Change and Policy Studies, human-caused climate change in Turkey started in the 1970s. CMIP 6 models it well. One example of climate change's impact will be on the distribution of rainfall: the descending edge of the Hadley cell (an area of circulation near the equator) may move northwards towards Turkey, whose southern border is around 36 degrees north, and this may reduce rainfall in the south of the country.

Temperature and weather changes
 the highest ever recorded temperature was 49.1 C on 20 July 2021 in Cizre. , the hottest year on record was 2010, second hottest 2018 and third 2020. In 2021 the Agriculture and Forestry Deputy Minister said that the rise in the average annual temperature would likely be between 1 and 2 degrees between that time and the end of the century. Turkey is forecast to be more severely affected than many other countries, but effects vary considerably across the regions of the country, with the largest temperature rises forecast for southern and western regions in the summer. The worst case is a 7 degree rise in temperature by 2100.

The weather is becoming more extreme, and in 2021 there were extensive wildfires in the south and floods in the north. Wildfires in Turkey have increased due to climate change, and wind speed is predicted to increase throughout the Marmara region. During the 21st century temperatures are forecast to rise by 2–3 °C on average and overall precipitation to significantly reduce. However, precipitation may increase in the north, and more floods are predicted, due to rainfall replacing snow. Seasonally, there may be more precipitation in the winter, but 50% less in spring and autumn. Urban heatwaves (especially in the south and east), droughts, storms, and flooding may increase.

Sea level rise
Over 200 thousand people live in areas at risk of 1 meter sea level rise. Tectonic uplift has decreased sea level rise between Samsun and Alanya, whereas several large river deltas have subsided. Istanbul is at risk from sea level rise; for example, Kadıkoy metro station is threatened with flooding.

Water resources
From 1979 to 2019, Turkey's average annual precipitation was slightly over 50 cm, and its average temperature was around 15 °C. Climate change has reduced rainfall and makes it less regular, and hydropower falls in proportion to the rainfall. During this period, annual precipitation fluctuated from over 60 cm to under 45 cm, and average annual temperatures varied by 4 degrees. The highest precipitation is in the eastern Black Sea Region.

Turkey is already a water stressed country, because the amount of water per person is only about 1,500 m³ a year: and due to population increase and climate change it is highly likely the country will suffer water scarcity (less than 1,000 m³) by the 2070s. Little change is forecast for water resources in the northern river basins, but a substantial reduction is forecast for the southern river basins. Konya in central Turkey is also vulnerable.

Producing one gram of beef requires 122 litres of water (compared to 29 litres for the same amount of protein from eggs and 19 litres from plants), but although climate change is causing droughts in Turkey, the production of newborn calves is subsidized.

Ecosystems
In coastal areas, highly affected land types are permanent wetlands, croplands and grassland. Climate models predict that extreme weather events will increase in the Mediterranean. Glaciers in Turkey are retreating: the largest remaining are the glaciers on Mount Ararat and these are forecast to be gone by 2065, as they are melting much faster than mountain glaciers in many other parts of the world. Because the climate in the south is forecast to become hotter and drier it may be very difficult to keep the current southern forests in Turkey. In 2020 there were more forest fires than normal. Soil erosion is forecast to increase. 2020 had a hotter December than before, and trees bloomed in Istanbul, which is not normal. The rise in sea surface temperature is one of the causes of marine mucilage in the Sea of Marmara, and is expected to further change marine life in Turkish waters. The temperature of the Black Sea has increased by 2 degrees, and there are concerns of bears in the region not hibernating.

Impacts on people

Economic impacts
Floods in 2020 caused billions of lira (hundreds of millions of dollars) in damages. Environment Minister Murat Kurum estimated in 2021 that losses due to disasters caused by climate change would amount to billions of lira (hundreds of millions of dollars). Loss in Gross Domestic Product per person by 2100 is forecast in one study to be less than 1% if the concentration of GhG in the atmosphere is kept fairly low (Representative Concentration Pathway (RCP) 2.6) but almost 8% for severe global warming (RCP 8.5). The World Bank has estimated the cost and benefits of stopping net carbon emissions, but has suggested government do far more detailed planning. For companies which responded to the Carbon Disclosure Project in 2020 the main climate change risk to their businesses is carbon pricing, such as the European Union Carbon Border Adjustment Mechanism.

Agriculture

Unless global emissions are greatly reduced agriculture in Turkey, such as wheat, is expected to be severely affected after the late 2030s especially in areas with rain fed agriculture. Arid and semi-arid areas are at risk of desertification. According to Professor Barış Karapınar, water is lost through evaporation due to "old-fashioned" irrigation techniques used by the Southeastern Anatolia Project, increasing the risk of severe water shortage. Irrigated agriculture will decline as water stress increases and increasing food imports will hit Turkey's trade balance.

Damage to agriculture is predicted to greatly increase, for example due to "false spring" germination or blossoming followed by a cold snap. The increase in early blooming, which is happening due to climate change, can be a problem for crops such as fruit trees. Vineyards in Thrace are being affected. Pine nut production has been severely reduced. A significant decline in agricultural production is transmitted throughout the economy and reduces national welfare.

Hydropower
Reduced precipitation and hydroelectricity in Turkey is forecast, for example in the Tigris and Euphrates river basins, like the 2020 drought. To conserve hydropower, solar power is being added next to the hydropower.

Fisheries and aquaculture

According to the Food and Agriculture Organization of the United Nations, fishing in the Black Sea is sensitive to the impacts of climate change, and according to the Turkish Marine Research Foundation all Turkish seas will be affected. The warming of Lake Van is reducing oxygen for pearl mullet.

Tourism
Tourism in Turkey may become too hot in the summer for some people, for example Antalya could become too hot for some visitors during school holidays in summer. Development of ski resorts in the Central Taurus and eastern Black Sea region mountains may not be possible.

Health impacts 
1,350 people died because of floods between 1970 and 2014 in Turkey and about 2 million people were affected by those floods. Climate change may impact health in Turkey, for example due to increased heatwaves, especially elderly and chronically ill people and children. Wildfires in Turkey were the worst in the history of the republic in 2021 and killed several people and injured hundreds. Droughts risk mosquito borne diseases.

Impacts on migration 
There are over 3 million refugees of the Syrian Civil War in Turkey. But although severe droughts in Syria, such as those in 2007–2008 in the northeast, are made more likely by climate change in the Middle East, according to academics it is very unlikely that this was a cause of the Syrian civil war.

According to the United Nations Development Programme, decreasing rainfall is exacerbating the wide social and regional disparities within Turkey, and the gap between south-eastern provinces and the rest of the country is widening.

Impacts on housing
Environmentalists say that new highways and building concrete are hindering absorption of floodwater by the land. Because of the increase in temperature, existing buildings will need more energy for cooling.

Mitigation

Adaptation

Policies and legislation to achieve adaptation 
A national strategy and action plan for adaptation to climate change was published in 2012, but Turkey has yet to submit a National Adaptation Plan to the UNFCCC. The Ministry of Agriculture and Forestry is researching the effects of climate change and developing an adaptation strategy.

The Ministry of Environment and Urban Planning coordinates activities to combat climate change in Turkey. In February 2021 the ministry said that adaptation plans for all seven regions had been completed and that it would present an adaptation report to parliament and set up a climate change research center. At the same time the ministry said that work on sectoral adaptation strategies was continuing for: agriculture, livestock breeding, tourism, renewable energy and industry.

The impacts of climate change on surface water and groundwater for individual water basins have been identified, and adaptation activities have been determined. The implementation area of the project is 25 river basins covering the whole of Turkey, and the projection period covers the years 2015 to 2100. Many other projects like Increasing water storage capacity; Lake-Water Project; Basin Protection Action Plans; Transforming Basin Protection Action Plans to River Basin; Management Plans; Studies on Protecting Drinking Water Basins; Drought Management Studies; Saving Water in Irrigation; Distribution of Water Among Sectors have been built. New buildings of over 2000 square metres must now include rooftop water collection.
 
Projects related to climate change and agriculture include: Turkey's Strategy of Fighting Agricultural Drought and Action Plan (2018–2022); Agricultural Monitoring and Information (TARBIL) System; Agriculture and Rural Development Support Institution (TKDK); Agricultural Insurance Law; Developing Agricultural Publication Project (TAR-GEL); Studies of Fighting Erosion; Climate Change National Action Plan-Agriculture Sector.

According to the Eleventh Development Plan (2019–2023): "It is seen that climate change accelerating due to high greenhouse gas emissions causes natural disasters and poses a serious threat to humanity." and "International climate change negotiations will be conducted within the framework of the Intended National Contribution with the principles of common but differentiated responsibilities and respective capabilities, and within the scope of national conditions, climate change will be tackled in sectors causing greenhouse gas emissions and the resilience of the economy and society to climate risks will be increased by capacity building for adaptation to climate change."  the chief climate change envoy is Mehmet Emin Birpınar, a Deputy Minister of Environment. Environment Minister Murat Kurum launched the Black Sea Climate Change Action Plan in 2019, as part of Turkey's plans to adapt to climate change. Xeriscaping of green spaces in cities has been suggested, and Istanbul has a climate change action plan.

 a climate change law has not been passed, although a draft was published in 2020.

Society and culture

International cooperation 

According to the Ministry of Energy and Natural Resources, climate change is one of the world's biggest problems. Turkey was the fifth-largest recipient of multilateral climate funds between 2013 and 2016, receiving $231 million through channels such as the Clean Technology Fund (CTF) and the Global Environment Facility (GEF).

As of October, 2021, Turkey has ratified the Paris Agreement, with all 353 parliamentary members voting unanimously in favor of ratification. Prior to this, it was one of the last few remaining countries, alongside neighboring country Iran, to not have ratified the agreement. It was the last of the G20 countries to ratify. Their reason for delay, according to the current presidency at the G20 summit in 2020, was the countries "negligible historical responsibility for greenhouse gas emissions (less than 1%)". Turkey is not party to the Convention on Environmental Impact Assessment in a Transboundary Context (Espoo Convention). Similarly Turkey has signed but not ratified the Kigali Amendment to reduce production and use of hydrofluorocarbons. It has no carbon tax or emissions trading scheme, therefore carbon capture and storage is not used as it is not economically viable. Armenia says that dam construction in Turkey has combined with climate change to reduce flow in the Araks River basin.

Activism 

In 2020 first lady Emine Erdoğan said that “Every wrong step we take can be a disaster for future generations”. In 2021, according to Daily Sabah, she claimed the role of individuals as "more important than switching to renewable energy sources to cut dependency on fossil fuels".

In 2019 some Turkish schoolchildren joined the School Strike for Climate, and Turkey's branch of Extinction Rebellion demonstrated for Turkey to ratify the Paris Agreement.

Muslim environmentalists and academics quote the Quran in support of their environmentalism. In Istanbul in 2015, Islamic leaders urged the world's 1.6 billion Muslims to help defeat climate change.

Children's-rights petition and lawsuit
Environmental activist Greta Thunberg and 15 other children filed a petition in 2019 protesting lack of action on the climate crisis by Argentina, Brazil, France, Germany, and Turkey saying that, amongst other dangers, more deadly heat waves would affect them and other children in future. The petition challenged the five countries under the Convention on the Rights of the Child: "Comparable emissions to Turkey's rate of emissions would lead to more than 4°C of warming." If the petition is successful, the countries will be asked to respond; however, any suggestions are not legally binding. In 2020, Turkey and 32 other countries were sued at the European Court of Human Rights by a group of Portuguese children.

Media and arts

In the 1990s independent Açık Radyo (Open Radio) broadcast some of the first media coverage of climate change, and its founder Ömer Madra  emphasises "The three Y's in the fight on climate change: Yerel (local) Yatay (horizontal) and Yavaş (slow, no resort to violence)." İklim Haber (Climate News) also covers climate change issues in Turkish and English. Mainstream Turkish media tends to view new coal-fired power stations as increasing employment rather than causing climate change; nearly all media owners have financial interests in fossil fuels. The media covers climate change only during extreme weather events, with insufficient expert opinions or civil-society perspectives. The arts are raising awareness of climate change, and education is supported by the EU.

Public perception
Individual action on climate change is not properly understood (in a survey of primary school teachers many erroneously prioritised using less cosmetics) and neither are government choices on climate change mitigation (in the same survey only a minority correctly prioritised curbing fossil fuel use). Future warming of seawater by Akkuyu Nuclear Power Plant is wrongly thought by some to be relevant to climate change, and few know that geothermal power in Turkey might emit considerable .

İklim Haber (Climate News) and KONDA Research and Consultancy found in 2018 that over three-quarters of public opinion on climate change thinks that extreme weather has increased. According to the latest report written in Turkish and prepared by another collaboration of İklim Haber and Konda Research in 2020, 51.5% of the public opinion believe that the climate crisis is a bigger threat than the coronavirus crisis. Also, 71.4% of the public opinion acknowledge that current climate crisis is a result of human activities. Some construction companies have been accused of greenwashing, advertising their buildings as environmentally friendly without obtaining any green building certificates.

In a 2019 E3G poll of six Belt and Road Initiative countries (including Turkey), solar was the most popular energy source and coal the least popular. Twenty-four Turkish cities committed to the Paris Agreement targets that year, and the United Nations Development Programme partnered with the Turkish Basketball Federation in 2020 to raise public awareness of the fight against climate change. A 2020 study found that the level of public support for a potential carbon tax does not depend on whether the proceeds are used for mitigation and adaptation.

See also

Climate change in Cyprus
Climate change in Europe
Climate change in the Middle East and North Africa

Notes

Further reading

References

External links 
 Turkish State Meteorological Service (in Turkish)
 Documents submitted to the UNFCCC by Turkey
 Istanbul International Centre for Energy and Climate
 Climate Change in Turkey:Istanbul Policy Center: Sabanci University
 İklim Haber (Climate News) – Newspaper focusing on climate change
 Climate Laws - Laws, policies and litigation
 Climate Portal - 'scientifically verified and reliable studies on climate change'

 
Climate of Turkey
Turkey